The  is a ROM cartridge in the form of a card, designed by Hudson Soft for NEC's PC Engine and PC Engine SuperGrafx video game consoles, which were originally released in 1987 and 1989, respectively. In the United States, where the PC Engine was marketed as the TurboGrafx-16, the HuCard is alternately called the TurboChip.

The HuCard is an evolution from an earlier Hudson Soft technology, the Bee Card, which it developed in the early 1980s as a distribution medium for MSX computer software. The Bee Card is an EEPROM device that is slightly thinner than the HuCard. It has 32 connectors whereas the HuCard has 38. Most video game cartridges have a large plastic housing to protect the PCB while providing enough space inside for radiant heat and, less often, a button cell. The PCB in a HuCard or Bee Card is protected by a rigid, glossy polymer that conducts heat; since the PC Engine and TurboGrafx-16 leave one side of the card partially exposed while inserted in the console, heat disperses with less obstruction.

Hudson Soft, NEC, and other vendors published seven HuCard games specifically for the PC Engine SuperGrafx. Hudson Soft called this enhanced medium the Super HuCard.

Video game developers made new releases on HuCard until December 1994, when 21 Emon: Mezase! Hotel Ō was released in Japan for the PC Engine. It was the last official release for the platform in any region. Atlantean, an independent game released on a HuCard, was made available in August 2014. Jessie Jaeger in Cleopatra's Curse is a new title in development with a planned release in 2022.

See also
 Famicom Modem
 Sega Card
 Nintendo game card

References

Computer-related introductions in 1987
Solid-state computer storage media
TurboGrafx-16
Video game distribution
Video game storage media